Moustafa Bayoumi (born 1966) is an American writer, journalist, and professor. He is of Egyptian descent. He is based in Brooklyn, New York.  He is a professor of English at Brooklyn College, City University of New York.

Biography 
Moustafa Bayoumi was born in Zürich, Switzerland, and raised in Kingston, Ontario, Canada. Bayoumi completed his Ph.D. in English and Comparative Literature at Columbia University.

He is co-editor of The Edward Said Reader (Vintage, 2002), editor of Midnight on the Mavi Marmara: The Attack on the Gaza Freedom Flotilla and How It Changed the Course of the Israeli/Palestine Conflict (first published by OR Books, trade edition by Haymarket Books, 2010) and has published academic essays in publications including Transition, Interventions, the Yale Journal of Criticism, Amerasia, Arab Studies Quarterly, and the Journal of Asian American Studies.

Writings
His writings have also appeared in The Nation,  London Review of Books, and The Village Voice. His essay "Disco Inferno", originally published in The Nation, was included in the collection "Best Music Writing 2006". From 2003 to 2006, he served on the National Council of the American Studies Association, and he was also an editor for Middle East Report. Since 2015, he has also been a regular contributor to The Guardian newspaper, mainly contributing opinion pieces. 

Bayoumi's work, How Does It Feel to Be a Problem?: Being Young and Arab in America, traces the experiences of seven young Arab-Americans navigating life in a post–September 11 environment, where complicated public perceptions of the attacks gave birth to new brands of stereotypes, fueling widespread discrimination. It is the story of how young Arab and Muslim Americans are forging lives for themselves in a country that often mistakes them for the enemy. His title is a reference to the W.E.B. Du Bois' 1903 classic, The Souls of Black Folk. How Does It Feel to Be a Problem?: Being Young and Arab in America was awarded a 2008 American Book Award and the 2009 Arab American Book Award for Non-Fiction.

In This Muslim American Life: Dispatches from the War on Terror (NYU Press, 2015), Bayoumi reveals what the War on Terror looks like from the vantage point of Muslim Americans, highlighting the profound effect this surveillance  has had on how they live their lives. The essays expose how contemporary politics, movies, novels, media experts and more have together produced a culture of fear and suspicion that not only willfully forgets the Muslim-American past, but also threatens all of our civil liberties in the present. This Muslim American Life was awarded the 2016 Evelyn Shakir Non-Fiction Arab American Book Award.

References

External links
Moustafa Bayoumi official website
Faculty: Moustafa Bayoumi at Brooklyn College
A Postcolonial Scholar in the Department of English Takes Pride in Student Success, September 8, 2004
Column archive at The Guardian
Column archive at The Nation
Edward W. Said (1935–2003) A Testimonial to My Teacher, Village Voice, September 30, 2003
Shadows and Light: Colonial Modernity and the Grand Mosquee of Paris, Moustafa Bayoumi, Yale Journal of Criticism, Fall 2000
Brooklyn College Facing Criticism Over Required Reading by Harsh Israel Critic The Jewish Week, August 27, 2010

Living people
American academics of English literature
Columbia Graduate School of Arts and Sciences alumni
Brooklyn College faculty
Swiss emigrants to the United States
Writers from Zürich
American Book Award winners
Writers from Brooklyn
American people of Egyptian descent
1966 births